The Assistant Chief of Staff Operations and Training, abbreviated as ACOS Ops & Trg, is the head of the Staff Department for Operations and Training of the Belgian Ministry of Defence. He reports to the Chief of Defence and is responsible for the training of the Belgian Armed Forces and for its operations. The current ACOS Operations and Training is Major General Vincent Descheemaeker.

The ACOS Operations and Training advises the Chief of Defence in his capacity as commander of the intervention force and has the operational command over the Armed Forces, which he, in turn, delegates this to the commanders of the four components: the Land Component, the Air Component, the Naval Component and the Medical Component.

Military appointments of Belgium